This list is of Major Sites Protected for their Historical and Cultural Value at the National Level in the autonomous region of Xinjiang, People's Republic of China.

  
  
    
    
   

 
 
  

  

 

 

|}

See also
 Principles for the Conservation of Heritage Sites in China

References

 
Xinjiang